Tunduma is a town in Songwe Region, Tanzania, on the border between Tanzania and Zambia. It has border posts for both the Tanzam Highway and the TAZARA railway (for which it has a station) linking the two countries.  It is located 103 km southwest of Mbeya.  It is also the junction for the tarmac road which runs via Sumbawanga through the remote far western districts of Tanzania to Kasulu and Kibondo in the north-west. According to the 2018 projection census, it has a population of more than 141,000.

References 

Populated places in Songwe Region
Tanzania–Zambia border crossings